Kabab koobideh or Kobide is an Iranian meat kabab made from ground lamb or beef, often mixed with ground pepper and chopped onions.

Etymology
Koobideh comes from the Persian word koobidan (کوبیدن) meaning slamming which refers to the style in which the meat is prepared. Traditionally, the meat was placed on a flat stone (specifically, a black flat stone) and smashed with a wooden mallet. It is cooked on a seekh, Persian for 'skewer'. It is similar to the Turkish Adana kebab.

Preparation and cooking

Lamb or beef (precisely 20% fat, 80% meat) is minced twice for finer consistency. A mixture of lamb and beef is also popular. Salt, black pepper, very finely grated onion and optionally one egg yolk per pound of meat is added. All ingredients are mixed, covered, and left to marinate in the refrigerator for at least one hour or overnight.

Kabab koobideh is grilled on wide, flat skewers, traditionally over hot coals, and is served with chelow (plain white rice with oil, salt and saffron), accompanied by grilled tomatoes and onions. Sumac is usually served as a tableside garnishing spice.

Chicken kabab koobideh is made using chives or green onions, parsley, salt and pepper. It is served over polow, plain white rice, accompanied by a grilled tomato.

Gallery

See also
 Adana kebabı
 Ćevapi
 Chelow kabab
 Kabab barg
 Kebab
 Kofta
 List of kebabs
 Lula kebab
 Şiş köfte

References

Ground meat
Iranian cuisine
Middle Eastern grilled meats
Skewered kebabs